Kesaria peda is a sweet made for festivals and celebrations. It was first prepared by Badhu Sao, during his imprisonment at kala pani when Queen Victoria, Empress of India, was going to visit kala pani. The ingredients include Mawa, sugar, cardamon powder, saffron, and almonds to garnish.

Sugar confectionery
Indian desserts